Billy Simons (born December 17, 1983) is an American singer-songwriter originally from Ludlow, Massachusetts. His music is often described as acoustic pop, rock, and folk. Although he sometimes plays with a trio, Simons mostly plays solo acoustic shows incorporating a suitcase kickdrum, guitar tapping, beatboxing, a looping effects pedal, and a distorted microphone through which he sings what sound like guitar solos, always playing with Taylor Guitars and Gibson Guitars.

History 
In 2004, Billy Simons began giving live performances at New York City venues such as The Bowery Ballroom, The Bitter End, Sin-e, The Living Room, and The Canal Room. In 2007, Simons released a compilation of his compositions under the title "The Joker's Hand" (2007) on iTunes.  Notable songs include "Sister Agnes," "Body," and "Part II."  In 2009, Simons released a live solo acoustic album, "Live at the Academy" (2009). Later that year, Simons released "Music From the Motion Picture" (2009) following his sold-out CD release performance at The Bitter End in New York City. He has opened performances for Bobby McFerrin; Susan Tedeschi; Dave Matthews collaborator Tim Reynolds; Pete Francis of Dispatch; country superstar Phil Vassar; Matisyahu; Spin Doctors Lead Singer Chris Barron; and Pure Prairie League.

Discography 
Studio Albums & EPs
2003: "Billy Simons" (EP)
2007: "The Joker's Hand"
2008: "Sessions On A Hill" (EP)
2009: "Music From The Motion Picture"
2010: "Elyria"
2018: "Bless Your Heart"

Live Albums
2009: "Live At The Academy"

References

External links 
 Official Homepage
 Billy Simons on MySpace

Video Links:
 Billy Simons plays "Body" from the album, "Live At The Academy"

Singer-songwriters from Massachusetts
1983 births
Living people
People from Ludlow, Massachusetts
21st-century American singers